Macauley Davies (born 4 September 1996) is an English former professional rugby league footballer who played as a  forward for the Wigan Warriors in the Super League.

Background
Davies was born in Billinge Higher End, Wigan, England

Career
In 2017, Davies joined Workington Town on a season-long loan deal.

References

External links
Wigan Warriors profile
SL profile

Living people
1996 births
Rugby league second-rows
Wigan Warriors players